WIZE (1340 AM) — branded Dayton's BIN 1340 — is a commercial all-news radio station in Springfield, Ohio owned by iHeartMedia, Inc. as part of their Dayton cluster. While servicing the Dayton metropolitan area, WIZE is also targeted towards Springfield, and their transmitter - and former studios - are located in Springfield. WIZE functions as the Dayton market affiliate for the Black Information Network. In addition to a standard analog transmission, WIZE streams via iHeartRadio.

History
The station took the air on November 1, 1940, and was very active in the community. Its founder and first owner was The Radio Voice of Springfield Inc.

In the station's early days, nationally known comedian Jonathan Winters had a program on WIZE. However, in the mid-1960s, WIZE adopted a Top 40 format, increasing its popularity and revenue.  Under the leadership of Station Manager Steve Joos, listenership (and advertising revenues) grew to the point that WIZE was the most profitable station in the Great Trails Broadcasting chain. WING in Dayton, WCOL in Columbus and WGTZ, Eaton (formerly WJAI) were also owned by Great Trails.

The station was moved from its downtown location on West High Street to a location on Miracle Mile.  In order to comply with zoning regulations, the building had to be set back from the road and had to look like a residence.  As a result, WIZE's studios had a country setting while remaining in the city. Among the list of past employees include Jim Baldridge(later of WHIO-TV), Duke Rollins, Sonny Palmer, Paul Carman, Ron Allen (now with ESPN International), the late John Hall (John Stalder), Johnny Walker (DJ born 1942) (later of WKEF-TV), Lee Brenner (Lee Aufdenkampe), Ric Jonns (formerly of Radio Caroline North), Fred "Buddy" King, John King (F. John Damewood), Geoff Davis,  Jerry "T" Tritle, and Pat Barry (who achieved more recognition as a TV weatherman in Cincinnati). WIZE was also the home to news and sports director Gerry Allen (Gerry Pavelka) and notable news reporters Karen Anderson and Darryl Bauer (now of WHIO-AM). Will Harris also worked with Gerry Allen on high school and Wittenberg sports broadcasts in the 70's. He went on to work in Dayton at WHIO, WONE, WCLR (in Piqua) and WPFB FM (then known as the Rebel). He is now on the air and is one of the owners of Downtown Dayton Radio (DDR) which is an online radio station (www.downtowndaytonradio.com) dedicated to promoting events in Dayton.

In 1982, Joos left WIZE to accept a position in Columbus.  He was replaced as General Manager by Joe Taylor who instituted numerous changes in the station.  He brought in two new staff members (Sandy Alexander and Dennis Carter) and changed the format to a unique middle-of-the-road type format.  This was at a time when FM radio was becoming more popular and AM stations were having problems attracting listeners and advertising revenues. Taylor thus instituted an all-out sales push, selling commercials for as little as a dollar.  As a result, the station was oversold, often running as much as 40 minutes of commercial material each hour.

Taylor only lasted a few years as General Manager, and was replaced by George Wymer (son of WING, Dayton, radio legend Jack Wymer) with the intention of purchasing the station from Great Trails.  He was unable to make the purchase and left the station.

The next General Manager was Jerry Staggs, who eventually did purchase the station.  Under Staggs' watch, WIZE associated with the former WBLY, the predecessor of WULM as part of a local marketing agreement with owner RAY (Ronald A. Yontz) Broadcasting. By this time, both stations operated in the same building. Staggs sold the station in the 1990s to WONE's then-owner, JACOR Broadcasting using the name Citicasters, which dropped all local programming for a simulcast of WONE, effectively ending any and all relationship with Springfield.

After a stint as a country music station, WONE/WIZE changed to Adult Standards on November 29, 1994. It adopted its present sports talk format (as "Sports ONE") on December 8, 2003, competing with Radio One-owned WING. This eventually became a near-total simulcast of then "1360 Homer" in Cincinnati, even though the programming was originated from the Dayton Ohio studios and was in no way connected to the Cincinnati market, even as the "Homer" format itself moved from WSAI to WCKY 1530-AM in July 2006. This "simulcast" of nationally syndicated programming or at least the appearance of a simulcast with WCKY would eventually be further diluted in 2007, when WONE/WIZE would start to air local sports talk in the afternoon, as well as clearing Fox Sports Radio in the morning hours (which eventually led to a clearance of Dayton native Dan Patrick's late morning show.)

WIZE continued to relay WONE until April 22, 2011, when it broke away to carry a country oldies music format when a need was created by the former 101.7 FM, now 101.5 licensed to Urbana and now ENON, Ohio left the Springfield Market for the greener pastures of the larger Dayton Market. WULM's usage of the former WIZE studios at the WIZE transmitter site ended in June 2010 (when after being sold to Radio Maria Inc. as a repeater of originating station KJMJ in the spring of 2008), the WULM studio equipment  was moved to the Father Boyle Center near St. Bernard Parish at 920 Lagonda Avenue which will feed local live programs to originator KJMJ and its repeater network...as a result, the WIZE studio building now only houses transmitting and remote broadcasting equipment as WIZE programming is fed from Dayton. Where Local Wittenberg college and high school sports and coaches show programming is fed from Springfield back to Dayton and then fed back to Springfield for air.

WIZE dropped the classic country format to carry iHeart's Black Information Network—branded as Dayton's BIN 1340—on July 27, 2020.

References

 Greater Cincinnati Radio Guide

External links

IZE
Radio stations established in 1940
IHeartMedia radio stations
Black Information Network stations
All-news radio stations in the United States